The Oakland City Council is an elected governing body representing the City of Oakland, California.

Since 1998, Oakland has had a mayor-council government. The mayor is elected for a four-year term. The Oakland City Council has eight council members representing seven districts in Oakland with one member elected at-large; council members serve staggered four-year terms, and are all elected using instant-runoff voting. The mayor appoints a city administrator, subject to the confirmation by the City Council, who is the chief administrative officer of the city. Other city officers include: city attorney (elected), city auditor (elected), and city clerk (appointed by city administrator).  Oakland's Mayor is subject to a tenure limited to two terms.  There are no term limits for the city council.

Current Council

Past Councils

2018 members
 District 1 – Dan Kalb (elected in 2012, 2016) (President Pro Tempore) 
 District 2 – Nikki Fortunato Bas (elected in 2018)
 District 3 – Lynette Gibson McElhaney (elected in 2012,2016) (also Council President)
 District 4 – Sheng Thao (elected in 2018)
 District 5 – Noel Gallo (elected in 2012, 2016)
 District 6 – Loren Taylor (elected in 2018)
 District 7 – Larry Reid (elected in 1996, 2000, 2004, 2008, 2012 and 2016) (Vice Mayor)
 Councilmember At Large – Rebecca Kaplan (elected in 2008, 2012, 2016) (City Council Chair)

2016 members
 District 1 – Dan Kalb (2012)
 District 2 – Abel J. Guillen (elected 2014)
 District 3 – Lynette Gibson McElhaney (2012) (also Council President)
 District 4 – Annie Campbell Washington (2014)
 District 5 – Noel Gallo (2012)
 District 6 – Desley Brooks (2002, ...) (elected 2002, 2006, 2010, 2014)
 District 7 – Larry Reid (also President Pro Tempore) (1997, ...) (re-elected in 2000, 2004, 2008, 2012 and 2016)
 Councilmember At Large – Rebecca Kaplan (also Vice Mayor) (2009, ...) (2008, reelected in 2012, 2016)

2012 members
 District 1 – Dan Kalb (2013)
 District 2 – Patricia Kernighan (also Council President) (2005, ...) (re-elected 2010)
 District 3 – Lynette Gibson McElhaney (2013)
 District 4 – Libby Schaaf (2011, ...) (elected 2010)
 District 5 – Noel Gallo (2013)
 District 6 – Desley Brooks (2002, ...) (elected 2002, 2006, 2010)
 District 7 – Larry Reid (also Vice Mayor) (1997, ...) (re-elected in 2004, 2008, and 2012)
 Councilmember At Large – Rebecca Kaplan (also President Pro Tempore) (2009, ...) (2008, reelected in 2012)

Former Councilmembers
 Frank H. Ogawa, first Japanese American on the City Council, served from 1966 until his death in 1994.
 Henry Chang, Jr appointed to at-large seat 1994 after death of Frank Ogawa, elected in 1997. Served until 2009.
 Jean Quan, councilmember for District 4 from 2003–2011, subsequently elected mayor, then defeated for re-election to mayor.
 John A. Russo, served 1994–2000
 Danny Wan, served 2000–2005
 Moses Mayne
 Wilson Riles (son of Wilson Riles, Sr.), councilmember from 1979 to 1992
 Nancy Nadel, served 1996–2012
 Ignacio De La Fuente, served 1992–2012
 Libby Schaaf, current Oakland mayor
 Desley Brooks, served 2002–2018
 Abel Guillen, served 2014–2018
 Annie Campbell Washington, served 2014–2018

References

External links
 Map of council districts

Government of Oakland, California
California city councils